Elimäki (Swedish: Elimä) is a former municipality of Finland.

It was located in the province of Southern Finland and was part of the region of Kymenlaakso. The municipality had a population of 8,199 and covered an area of 391.74 km² of which 4.27 km² was water. The population density was 21.2 inhabitants per km².

The municipality was unilingually Finnish.

Of note is the village of Koria, the largest village in Elimäki, possessing a population of 5,100. Koria is located 6,7 km west of Kouvola.

As of 2009, the six municipalities – Kouvola, Kuusankoski, Elimäki, Anjalankoski, Valkeala and Jaala – were consolidated, accounting for the new municipality of Kouvola with a population of over 80,000, being the 10th largest city in Finland.

Arboretum Mustila is located near Elimäki.

People born in Elimäki 
Jenny af Forselles (1869 – 1938)
Väinö Kajander (1893 – 1978)
Ilmari Salminen (1902 – 1986)
Erkki Pakkanen (1930 – 1973)
Kaarina Dromberg (1942 – ) 
Jarmo Wasama (1943 – 1966)
Osmo Puhakka (1948 – )
Pentti Sinersaari (1956 – )
Tuija Toivonen (1958 – )

References

External links 

Populated places disestablished in 2009
2009 disestablishments in Finland
Former municipalities of Finland
Kouvola